Christian Cullen is a New Zealand rugby union player who represented the New Zealand national rugby union team either as a fullback or a wing at international level from 1996 to 2002. He represented New Zealand in 58 test matches and scored 46 tries for his country. Cullen's try total places him ninth on the all-time list and he is the second highest try scorer for New Zealand behind Doug Howlett (49). He holds the record for the highest number of international tries scored in the fullback playing position in history.

Cullen made his international debut for New Zealand in a 51–10 victory over Samoa at McLean Park in Napier on 7 June 1996, scoring his first three international tries in the same match. He went on to score a further four tries in a 62–31 win against Scotland the following week. Cullen went on to score more tries in the Tri Nations Series in 1996, 1997, 1998, 1999 and 2000 and New Zealand's tour of Britain and Ireland in 1997. His final three tries came in a test match on 29 June 2002 with Fiji at Westpac Stadium in Wellington, where he overtook Jeff Wilson's total of 44 to become the player with the highest number of tries scored for New Zealand. Cullen remained New Zealand's leading try-scorer until Howlett overtook Cullen's total in September 2007.

Of Cullen's 46 international tries, 27 were scored in test matches, 16 in the Tri Nations Series and 3 in New Zealand's 1997 tour of Britain and Ireland. He scored more against South Africa more than any other team, with ten tries, followed by Australia whom he scored eight tries against. Cullen scored multiple tries in a single international match on 13 occasions, including four hat-tricks. The first of these was a three-try effort against Samoa on his 1996 international debut. The second hat-trick was against Scotland in his second international game held the following week. The third was against Wales in New Zealand's 1997 Britain and Ireland tour and the last was over Fiji in a 2002 test match. Cullen scored tries against 11 countries, including eight of the eleven "Tier 1" countries and three "Tier 2" nations.

Key
 Won denotes that the match was won by New Zealand.
 Lost denotes that the match was lost by New Zealand.
 Draw denotes that the match was drawn.

International tries
Scores and results list New Zealand's tally first.

Hat-tricks

Statistics
Source:

Notes

References

New Zealand national rugby union team lists
International tries by Cullen
International tries by Cullen